The Chrysler Sunbeam is a small supermini three-door hatchback manufactured by Chrysler Europe at the former Rootes Group factory in Linwood in Scotland, from 1977-81. The Sunbeam's development was funded by a UK Government grant with the aim of keeping the Linwood plant running, and the small car was based on the larger Hillman Avenger, also manufactured there. After the takeover of Chrysler's European operations by PSA, the model was renamed Talbot Sunbeam and continued in production until 1981. A Talbot Sunbeam Lotus version was successful in rallying and won the World Rally Championship manufacturers' title for Talbot in 1981.

Background 
In the mid-1970s, the British automotive industry was in crisis, marred by bad management, frequent strikes and decreasing competitiveness compared to the increasingly successful French and Japanese automakers. It took its toll on Chrysler UK, which was the name given to the former Rootes Group after its takeover by the American-based Chrysler Corporation. In particular, the Linwood facility was generating losses due to many reasons, including underutilised capacity.

In 1975, the infamous Ryder Report led to the effective nationalisation of Chrysler UK's major competitor, British Leyland. Chrysler management decided that the company should therefore also benefit from state aid, and pressed the government for it by threatening to close the UK operations. The government agreed to a state grant reported at £55,000,000  to fund the development of a small car, to be developed in Chrysler's UK facilities and manufactured in Linwood.

Development 
The development of the new car started in January 1976, under the codename Project R424. The technical side was the responsibility of the engineering team in Ryton, while the styling was the responsibility of Chrysler's Whitley design studio in Coventry, led by Roy Axe (who left the UK for Chrysler's headquarters in the US before the car was launched). Many constraints, such as a very tight schedule, low budget and the need to use as many British components as possible, led to the decision to use the rear-wheel drive Hillman Avenger as the base for the new vehicle, rather than the more trendy front-wheel drive constructions of Chrysler's French subsidiary, Simca. The Sunbeam was, unlike the larger Horizon and Alpine models which were launched by Chrysler in the mid to late 1970s, never sold in France as a Simca.  Although it was targeted at the supermini size class, the Sunbeam's Avenger underpinnings meant that it was slightly larger than its intended rivals, and overlapped with the Horizon model.  For this reason, the Sunbeam was only available as a three-door derivative.

Basing the car on the Avenger's platform allowed for the car not only to use as many existing components as possible, but also to put it in production in Linwood quickly and at minimal investment. Other than that, most components were identical to those of the Avenger. The car took its steering wheel and instrument pod from Chrysler's recently launched award-winning Simca 1307/Chrysler Alpine.

On the outside, with the exception of the doors, which were straight from the two-door Avenger, the R424 was given an all-new body, styled very much in line with Chrysler's new, angular "international" style, conceived by Axe, which was first presented with the debut of the 1975 Simca 1307/Chrysler Alpine, and was later also represented by the 1977 Simca/Chrysler Horizon (Project C2). This ensured that the R424 fitted in well with the new Chrysler lineup and came across as fairly modern. Nevertheless, a constraint in the development process took its toll on the initial look of the car - as the C2's (Horizon's) headlamps were not available at the planned launch time of the R424, the small car was given the lamps of the prefacelift Hillman Avenger, which required the characteristic recessed mounting in the front fascia. The GLS version had a vinyl roof as standard.

There was only one body style for the Sunbeam, that of a three-door hatchback. The car was literally a hatchback, with the rear hatch formed out of a single piece of glass as seen previously on the Hillman Imp. This required a high rear sill, which, while increasing structural rigidity made the loading and unloading of luggage rather difficult. Although it was a good looking car with clean modern lines, the tricky luggage compartment and the lack of alternative bodystyles - the reasoning being that the Avenger range already offered saloon and estate variants - ultimately compromised the car's appeal in the UK market. The Sunbeam's main competitor in the UK, the Vauxhall Chevette was produced in different body styles, two- and four-door saloons and an estate, catering to a broader range of customers.

On the interior side, the "GL" version was the first car to sport printed "melded" fabric from Cambrelle on its seats. These have been considered similar to the Avenger in their comfort.

Until the R424's launch, most Chrysler UK products were sold in export markets under the Sunbeam brand of the former Rootes portfolio. Chrysler, however, was striving to cut down on the Rootes brand palette (which at that time existed solely by means of badge engineering) and introduce a pan-European image using the Chrysler brand as the only one for the whole range. The result was naming the car, "Chrysler Sunbeam", and the Sunbeam brand was discontinued, with the remaining Rootes Group models also rebranded as Chryslers in 1976.

Launch 
After a remarkably short development period of 19 months, the Chrysler Sunbeam was launched on July 23, 1977, to a quite positive reception by the British automotive press. An advertising campaign featured Petula Clark singing "...put a Chrysler Sunbeam in your life." There were initially three engine sizes; 0.9, 1.3 and 1.6 litres, and three trim levels available - base "LS", better-equipped "GL" and the most expensive "S". To reduce in-house competition, the more basic versions of the two-door Avengers were dropped at the same time in the UK market, and the Chrysler Horizon was only available in five-door form. The Sunbeam sold well, but was not a runaway success.

In spite of the ability to keep the UK business afloat, Chrysler was still making losses both in Europe and at home, and, facing the possibility of complete bankruptcy, decided to sell Chrysler Europe to PSA. The French company took control of the former Chrysler Europe effective January 1, 1979, and in the course of the year announced all former Chrysler Europe products would be rebranded to Talbots starting August 1, 1979. The Sunbeam was simply rebadged in the strictest sense of the word, with the Chrysler badge on the bonnet replaced by one that read "Talbot", but retaining its grille with a prominent Chrysler pentastar until 1981.

Sunbeam Ti and Sunbeam Lotus 

In order to boost the Sunbeam's image, a "hot hatch" version of the Sunbeam was launched at the 1978 British International Motor Show and Paris Motor Show, called "Sunbeam Ti". On sale in the UK from June 1979 priced at £3,779, it was based on the former Avenger Tiger (the name hailing back to the Sunbeam Tiger), a sporty version of the Avenger. The 1.6-litre (1,598cc) engine fitted to the Sunbeam with twin Weber carburetors delivered . It featured sporty two-tone paint and body kit, and was very sport-oriented, being stripped of equipment that would have compromised its performance (and image). It proved quite popular with reviewers and enthusiasts, and helped to emphasize the advantages of the Sunbeam's rear-wheel drive against more trendy (and spacious) front-wheel drive rivals.

Chrysler had also commissioned the sports car manufacturer and engineering company Lotus to develop a strict rally version of the Sunbeam. The resulting "Sunbeam Lotus" was based on the Sunbeam 1.6 GLS, but fitted with stiffer suspension, a larger anti-roll bar and a larger transmission tunnel. The drivetrain comprised an enlarged, 2,172 cc, version of the Lotus 1973 cc Type 907 engine, a 16V slant four engine (the Sunbeam version being the Type 911, along with a ZF gearbox, both mounted in the car at Ludham Airfield, close to the Lotus facility in Hethel, Norfolk, where the almost-complete cars were shipped from Linwood. Final inspection, in turn, took place in Stoke, Coventry.

The Sunbeam Lotus was unveiled at the Geneva Motor Show in April 1979, but the road-going version of the rally car was not ready for deliveries to the public until after the rebranding, and thus became the "Talbot Sunbeam Lotus". At first these were produced mostly in black and silver, although later models came in a moonstone blue and silver (or black) scheme. The car saw not only enthusiastic press reviews, but also much success in the World Rally Championship - in 1980, Henri Toivonen won the 29th Lombard RAC Rally in one, and, in 1981, the Sunbeam Lotus brought the entire manufacturer's championship to Talbot.

Talbot era 
After the takeover, PSA decided that keeping Linwood running would remain unprofitable in the long run and that the facility would have to be closed. This would also mean the end of the Avenger and Sunbeam model lines. The Sunbeam also overlapped in size with the Simca-based Chrysler Horizon,  while the Avenger upon which it was based overlapped with the Peugeot 305, both of which were launched in 1977 and were newer, front wheel drive designs.  The decision was quite reasonable, given the advanced age of the former and the fact that the "C2-short", in development, was to be launched. Even though the C2-short programme was eventually scrapped, PSA did prepare their own version, the Talbot Samba (based on PSA's own front-wheel drive supermini, the Peugeot 104). The Samba was launched in 1981, signalling the time the Sunbeam would take its final bow.

Even though the end was looming, the Sunbeam was afforded a facelift for its final 1981 model year, finally gaining flush headlamps along with an entire new front end, featuring the Talbot logo in lieu of the pentastar, which made it look completely in line with the new Talbot lineup. Until the time production ended, about 200,000 Sunbeams were made.

References 

1980s cars
Sunbeam
Hatchbacks
Subcompact cars
Group 4 (racing) cars
Rear-wheel-drive vehicles
Cars introduced in 1977